Catherina  Maria Leopoldina Cibbini-Kozeluch (Katerina Koželuh) (b. 20 February 1785, d. 12 August 1858) was a pianist and composer in the AUstrian Empire of Bohemian ancestry. She was born in Vienna, the daughter of prominent composer, pianist and music publisher Leopold Kozeluch. She studied music with her father and also with Muzio Clementi.

She married Anton Cibbini, and held the court office of first lady's maid to the Empress Karolina Augusta. Cibbini-Kozeluch died in Zakupy, near Česká Lípa.

Works
Selected works include:
Introduction et variations brillantes pour le piano-forte, op.2
Divertissements brillants, op.3
Introduction and Variations in Eb, op.5
Six waltzes pour piano-forte, op. 6
Introduction and Polonaise, op. 8
La ribembranza, op. 10
Grand trio concertante sur des motifs favoris pour deux pianos et violoncelle

References

1785 births
1858 deaths

Composers from the Austrian Empire
Pianists from the Austrian Empire
Women composers from the Austrian Empire